The 2010 World Jiu-Jitsu Championship, commonly known as the 2010 Mundials or 2010 Worlds, was an international jiu-jitsu event organised by the International Brazilian Jiu-Jitsu Federation (IBJFF) and held at California State University in Long Beach, California, USA, on 6 June 2010.

Teams results 
Results by Academy

References

World Jiu-Jitsu Championship